Disney XD is a Canadian English-language discretionary specialty channel owned by Corus Entertainment which launched on December 1, 2015. It is a localized version of the U.S. network of the same name operated under license from Disney Branded Television, which broadcasts live-action and animated programming aimed at kids between the ages of 6 and 15.

History
A Canadian version of Disney XD was originally launched by Astral Media on June 1, 2011 as a spin-off of Family Channel, which had historically held rights to the programming of Disney Channel and its spin-off brands. After Bell Media acquired Astral in 2013, the company sold Disney XD along with its sister channels (Family Channel and the French and English versions of Disney Junior) to DHX Media. On April 16, 2015, Corus Entertainment announced that it had reached an agreement to acquire the Canadian rights to Disney Channel programming and brands.

Disney XD programming initially aired in a programming block on the Canadian version of Disney Channel, which Corus launched on September 1, 2015. The Disney XD-branded channel owned by DHX was renamed Family Chrgd on October 9, 2015, then again to its current moniker on March 1, 2022.

The new Corus-owned Disney XD channel launched on December 1, 2015 as an exempt discretionary service. On September 1, 2017, the channel obtained a discretionary service licence from the CRTC. Through Corus Entertainment's acquisition of Shaw Media, Disney XD and its sister networks are now co-owned with the former Shaw Media channels as of April 1, 2016.

Programming

As of March 2023:

Current

Acquired programming

Animated series

Acquired from Disney Channel

Reruns of ended series

Original programming

Acquired programming

Former

Original programming

Animated series

Live-action series

Acquired programming

Animated series

Live-action series

Acquired from Disney Channel

Programming Blocks

Seasonal
 Melty Summer - This block airs all summer long and airs weekdays with new episodes of select shows and new series.
 25 Days of Christmas - This block features a mix of holiday-themed specials all December long.
 Halloween - This block features a mix of Halloween specials.

Former
 Marvel Universe - This block airs such Marvel programs as Guardians of the Galaxy and Marvel's Spider-Man, as well as some short series, such as Ant-Man and Rocket & Groot. This block is also mixed in with other Disney XD programs such as DuckTales, Milo Murphy's Law, Big Hero 6: The Series, Gravity Falls, Player Select, and Star vs. the Forces of Evil.

See also
 List of Disney XD TV channels

References

External links
 

Children's television networks in Canada
Corus Entertainment networks
Television channels and stations established in 2015
Digital cable television networks in Canada
Canada
English-language television stations in Canada
2015 establishments in Canada